Rodrigo Tarín Higón (born 5 July 1996) is a Spanish professional footballer who plays as a central defender for Real Oviedo.

Club career

Barcelona
Born in Chiva, Valencian Community, Tarín joined FC Barcelona's youth categories in 2011, from Valencia CF. On 18 September 2014, he renewed his contract until 2018, and was promoted to the reserves in Segunda División B the following July.

Tarín made his senior debut on 22 August 2015, starting in a 1–2 away loss against UE Cornellà. He scored his first senior goal on 17 September of the following year, netting the winner in a 2–1 home success over CD Atlético Baleares; in November, however, he suffered a knee injury which kept him out for six months.

Tarín made his professional debut on 19 August 2017, starting in a 2–1 away win against Real Valladolid in the Segunda División.

Leganés
On 27 June 2018, Tarín signed a three-year deal with La Liga side CD Leganés. He made his debut in the main category of Spanish football on 26 September, starting in a 2–1 home defeat of former side Barcelona.

In October 2020, shortly after relegation to the second tier, Tarín extended his contract with the Community of Madrid side until 2023. On 31 January 2022, after being sparingly used, he terminated his contract with the club.

Oviedo
On 31 January 2022, just hours after leaving Leganés, Tarín signed a three-and-a-half-year deal with fellow second division side Real Oviedo.

Honours

Club
Barcelona
 UEFA Youth League: 2013–14

References

External links
FC Barcelona official profile

1996 births
Living people
Sportspeople from the Province of Valencia
Spanish footballers
Footballers from the Valencian Community
Association football defenders
La Liga players
Segunda División players
Segunda División B players
FC Barcelona Atlètic players
CD Leganés players
Real Oviedo players
Spain youth international footballers